German submarine U-1006 was a Type VIIC/41 U-boat of Nazi Germany's Kriegsmarine during World War II.

She was ordered on 14 October 1941, and was laid down on 30 January 1943, at Blohm & Voss, Hamburg, as yard number 206. She was launched on 17 November 1943, and commissioned under the command of Oberleutnant zur See Horst Voigt on 11 January 1944.

Design
German Type VIIC/41 submarines were preceded by the heavier Type VIIC submarines. U-1006 had a displacement of  when at the surface and  while submerged. She had two shafts and two  propellers.

U-1006 was fitted with five  torpedo tubes (four fitted at the bow and one at the stern), fourteen torpedoes or 26 TMA or TMB Naval mines, one  SK C/35 naval gun, (220 rounds), one  Flak M42 and two  C/30 anti-aircraft guns. The boat had a complement of between forty-four and fifty-two.

Service history
U-1006 participated in one war patrol which resulted in no ships damaged or sunk.

U-1006 had Schnorchel underwater-breathing apparatus fitted out sometime before October 1944.

On 9 October 1944, U-1006 left Bergen, Norway, for what would be her first, and only, war patrol. Annan proceeded to drop depth charges on U-1006 even though they did not initially believe the contact was a U-boat. Annan then returned to the 6th EG where  also made contact with U-1006 and ordered Annan to attack again. The first depth charge attack had badly damaged U-1006 and forced her to surface. U-1006 was able to fire a torpedo at Annan as she approached, but it detonated prematurely causing no damage. After Annan illuminated the area she opened fire on U-1006, which was able to return fire for a short time. U-1006s 44 remaining crewmen abandoned ship and she was sunk by two depth charges, six men had been killed in the attack.

See also
 Battle of the Atlantic

References

Bibliography

External links

German Type VIIC/41 submarines
U-boats commissioned in 1944
World War II submarines of Germany
1944 ships
Ships built in Hamburg
Maritime incidents in October 1944
World War II shipwrecks in the Atlantic Ocean
U-boats sunk by depth charges
U-boats sunk by British warships